Gros Mont is an alp and mountain pass of the Swiss Alps, located south of Charmey in the canton of Fribourg. The alp lies at the upper end of the Vallée du Gros Mont, just north of a 1,404 metre high pass connecting Charmey with Rougemont (in the canton of Vaud). This mountain pass, on the watershed between the Jogne and the upper Sarine, is the lowest point between the massifs of the Vanil Noir and the Gastlosen.

References

Mountain passes of the Alps
Mountain passes of the canton of Fribourg